Live One is the first live album by Australian-New Zealand rock band Dragon. The album was recorded on 10 August 1984 at the Sydney Entertainment Centre during the promotion of the Body and the Beat album. Live One was released in June 1985 and peaked at number 62 on the Australian Kent Music Report. 

The album is dedicated to Paul Hewson, who appeared as part of the group on the recording, but who had died in early 1985. The album was also the last new Dragon recording to feature guitarist Robert Taylor, bookending Taylor's ten-year membership of the group. It also spelt the end of Terry Chambers' involvement with Dragon.

Track listing 
Side One
 "Wilderworld" (Johanna Pigott, Marc Hunter, Todd Hunter) – 4:00
 "Magic" (M. Hunter, Robert Taylor) – 3:53
 "Still in Love with You" (Paul Hewson) – 3:14
 "Body and the Beat" (M. Hunter, R. Taylor) – 4:45
 "Witnesses" (M. Hunter, T. Hunter) – 4:49
 "Promises" (J. Pigott, M. Hunter, T. Hunter) – 5:37

Side Two
 "Cry" (T. Hunter) – 4:23
 "April Sun in Cuba" (M. Hunter, P. Hewson) – 6:51
 "Are You Old Enough?" (P. Hewson) – 5:35
 "Rain" (J. Pigott, M. Hunter, T. Hunter) – 5:56

Charts

Personnel 
Terry Chambers – drums
Robert Taylor – guitar, vocals
Alan Mansfield – keyboards, guitar, vocals, remix
Paul Hewson – keyboards, vocals
Marc Hunter – lead vocals
Todd Hunter – vocals, bass, remix

Production
Recorded by Ernie Rose
Remixed by Steve Bywaters

References

External links
 Dragon – Live One (Album) @ Discogs.

Dragon (band) albums
1985 live albums
Live albums by New Zealand artists
PolyGram live albums
Albums produced by Peter Dawkins (musician)